Steelback could refer to:

Steelback Brewery, a Canadian microbrewery, based in Tiverton, Ontario
Steelback Centre, former name of the Essar Centre, a sports and entertainment facility located in Sault Ste. Marie, Ontario